Ahn Seo-hyun (born January 12, 2004) is a South Korean actress. She began her career as a child actress in 2008, and has since appeared in films and television series such as The Housemaid (2010), Single-minded Dandelion (2014) and the critically acclaimed Netflix film Okja (2017), which premiered at the 2017 Cannes Film Festival in competition for the Palme d'Or.

Filmography

Film

Television series

Variety shows

Music video appearances

Awards and nominations

References

External links 
 
 
 

2004 births
People from Suwon
Living people
21st-century South Korean actresses
South Korean child actresses
South Korean television actresses
South Korean film actresses